MWZ is the IATA code for Mwanza Airport, Tanzania

MWZ or mwz can also refer to:
 Malakai Watene-Zelezniak, a retired Australian rugby league player
 Mahishadahari railway station, West Bengal, India (station code: MWZ)
 Moingi language, a Bantu language spoken in the Democratic Republic of the Congo (iso 639-3 code: mwz)

See also
 13MWZ (men's jeans with zipper) a style of jeans made by Wrangler (jeans) first introduced in 1947.